Sant'Antonio al Mortito is an Italian Rationalism-style church in town of Casamicciola Terme, on Island of Ischia, southern Italy. The church is located in the quarter of Perrone.

History 
The church was founded in 1692 by Cesare Corbera, who was the nephew of St. John Joseph of the Cross. Cesare Corbera obtained the right of patronage for himself and his successors from the Curia. Around 1850 the property passed to the Lombardi of Perrone family, who embellished and modernized the rural church. In 1883, after the earthquake of July 28, it served as a Parish Church for a year.  A new church was consecrated in 1950.

The statue of the saint is a wooden statue of the 19th Century donated to the parish by an Umbrian monastery. The new simulacrum replaced the ancient terracotta statuette of 1850, enlarged in 1950.

See also
Catholic Church in Italy

Sources

External links 

Roman Catholic churches completed in 1950
20th-century Roman Catholic church buildings in Italy
Churches in the Metropolitan City of Naples